Miss Earth Ecuador 2018 is the 2nd edition of Miss Earth Ecuador pageant. The election night was held September 29, 2018 in Cuenca where Lessie Giler from Manabí crowned Diana Valdivieso from Manabí as well. The winner represented Ecuador at Miss Earth 2018 pageant.

Results

Placements

Special awards

Contestants

Notes

Debutss

 Chimborazo
 Orellana
 Tungurahua

Withdrawals

 Esmeraldas

Replacements

 Tungurahua - María Emilia Alvarado Arellano

Did not compete

 Pichincha - Pía Chiriboga

Crossovers

Jocelyn Mieles competed at Miss Ecuador 2017 where she was 1st Runner-up. Also, she competed at Miss International 2017 where she placed into the Top 8.

References

External links
Official Miss Ecuador website

2018 beauty pageants
Beauty pageants in Ecuador
Miss Earth